Brian Dietzen (born November 14, 1977) is an American actor who has played the supporting role of Dr. Jimmy Palmer on NCIS since 2004. In 2012, he was promoted to a series regular at the beginning of the show's tenth season.

Early life
Dietzen was born in Barrington, Illinois but moved to Colorado when very young. He first started acting in elementary school plays. Later, he studied theatre at the University of Colorado at Boulder's Bachelor of Fine Arts program.

Career
Dietzen has appeared in productions of Equus and Waiting for Godot and joined The Colorado Shakespeare Festival for two years. He was cast in The WB series My Guide to Becoming a Rockstar. The part was a series regular as the drummer of the group. He later teamed up with John Riggi for a two-man show with Steve Rudnick called The Oldest Man in Show Biz.

He performed in the film From Justin to Kelly and has had a recurring role as Dr. Jimmy Palmer, a medical examiner's assistant, on the CBS series NCIS, since the first season episode, "Split Decision".  Starting in season 1, 2004, he is a featured cast member with Dietzen also appearing in the opening credits.

Personal life
Dietzen lives in Los Angeles with his wife Kelly and their two children.

Filmography

Television series
 My Guide to Becoming a Rock Star (2002): Owen
 Boston Public (2002): David Caplan
 NCIS (2004–present): Dr. Jimmy Palmer
 NCIS: New Orleans (2016): Jimmy Palmer
 Perception (2013): Mark Leighton
 NCIS: Hawai'i (2022–2023): Jimmy Palmer

Films and television movies
 From Justin to Kelly (2003): Eddie
 Purgatory House (2004): Ghost
 Self-Inflicted (2005) 
 Nowhere to Hide (2009)
 One-Minute Time Machine, short film (2015)

References

External links
 

American male television actors
1977 births
Living people
Male actors from Colorado
University of Colorado Boulder alumni
21st-century American male actors
People from Barrington, Illinois
Male actors from Illinois